Ricardo Augusto Amaral Acioly (born 4 February 1964) is a former tennis player from Brazil. He has what is considered by many one of the most complete and successful careers in Brazilian tennis having been recognized Internationally as a player, coach, executive, tournament promoter and sports commentator.

He comes from a "tennis family". His father Claudio, who died in 2012, played tennis until he was 82 years old. His mother Teresinha still plays daily, competes in official tournaments and has reached the N1 position in the Ladies 85 and over ITF Seniors world ranking.

As a player 

As a junior Acioly was always one of the best Brazilian players of his age group winning many national titles and was a finalist  at the Orange Bowl, considered at the time the World Junior Championships. He then went on to play Division 1 college tennis and was team captain and the No. 1 player for the University of South Carolina, a top 20 team on the NCAA's Division 1 rankings.

After graduating with a Business Degree from South Carolina in 1985, Acioly went on to play the ATP Pro Tour for eight years and became a member of the Brazilian Davis Cup Team (87'/'88/'89) and the Brazilian Olympic Team (Seoul '88). During his career he played against some of top players in tennis like John McEnroe, Pete Sampras, Andre Agassi, Boris Becker, Mats Wilander and Yannick Noah.

He was ranked No. 46 in the world ATP doubles rankings. A six times finalist in tournaments at the highest level of the ATP Tour he won titles in Vienna, Geneva and Guarujá and was a finalist in Washington, Brasília and Maceio. He also played and represented Brazil in the 1988 Summer Olympics in Seoul, South Korea.

ATP career finals

Doubles: 6 (3 titles, 3 runners-up)

ATP Challenger and ITF Futures finals

Doubles: 9 (7–2)

Performance timeline

Doubles

As a coach 

As a full-time ATP travelling coach Acioly worked with several top players in the world like former ATP No. 1 Marcelo Ríos, WTA's N0. 2 Gabriela Sabatini, Fernando Meligeni (ATP 24), who he coached for 7 years and quite a few other players in the ATP Top 100 like Nicolás Pereira, Andre Sá, Javier Frana, Hernán Gumy and Alexandre Simoni. The results of the work with his players are significant having achieved a semifinal in the French Open, a semifinal and a quarterfinal in the Australian Open, a 4th place showing in the Atlanta Olympic Games and more than 10 titles on ATP Tour level tournaments in Singles and Doubles.

He was also Davis Cup captain for Brazil for six years and during his tenure as captain Brazil reached 1 semifinal and 2 quarter finals in the World Group. The list of team members coached during this period included world No. 1 Gustavo Kuerten, Fernando Meligeni, Jaime Oncins, Andre Sá, Flávio Saretta, Alexandre Simoni, Ricardo Mello and Marcio Carlsson. Up until today Brazil's biggest win in Davis Cup came under his leadership when in 1999 they defeated Spain in Lerida, Spain, against a team that had at the time four Top 10 players: Carlos Moyá, Àlex Corretja, Albert Costa and Félix Mantilla.

Acioly also worked and developed a number of top juniors that went on to have a successful careers on the ATP Tour like Marcelo Melo (world No. 1 in Doubles), João Souza (ATP No. 69), Franco Ferreiro (ATP top 50), Colombian Alejandro González (ATP No. 70) and quite a few others that had significant results in the ATP and ITF junior circuits.

Off court 

As a tennis executive Acioly is the only South American in history to have served as a director on the ATP Board of Directors. He is also a two time member of the ATP Player Council which has had players like Roger Federer, Rafael Nadal and Novak Djokovic as members. He has organized and promoted a number of professional events on the ATP's Challenger Tour, Champions Tour and currently serves as Director of Relations on the organizing committee of the Rio Open ATP 500, the biggest professional tennis tournament in South America.

Acioly is a tennis commentator for Globo Brazilian TV, SPORTV Channel and does the play by play for matches during the US Open Tennis, Wimbledon Championships, Davis Cup and all ATP Masters 1000 tournaments.

References

 
 
 

  

1964 births
Living people
Brazilian people of Italian descent
Brazilian male tennis players
Olympic tennis players of Brazil
Sportspeople from Rio de Janeiro (city)
Tennis players at the 1988 Summer Olympics